Joseph ben Joshua ben Meïr ha-Kohen (also Joseph HaKohen, Joseph Hakohen or Joseph Hacohen) (20 December 1496 in Avignon, France – 1575 or shortly thereafter, Genoa, Italy) was a historian and physician of the 16th century.

Life
Joseph's paternal family originally lived at Cuenca, Castile. His mother, Dolca, originated from Aragon. When the Jews were expelled from Spain the family settled at Avignon. At the age of five Joseph left Avignon with his parents and went to Genoa, where they remained until 1516. Driven from that city, they went to Novi, but returned to Genoa in 1538, where Joseph practiced medicine for twelve years. On June 3, 1550, he and all his coreligionists were driven from Genoa as a consequence of the rivalry of the non-Jewish physicians. Joseph then settled at Voltaggio, at the request of the citizens of that small town, practicing there until 1567. When the Jews were driven out of the territory of Genoa, he went to Costeletto (Montferrat), where he was very well received. In 1571 he was again established at Genoa, where he died in 1577 or 1578.

Joseph ha-Kohen had three sons (Joshua, Isaac, Judah) and two daughters. As for his brother Todros, he has tentatively been identified by Robert Bonfil with Ludovico Carretto, who is known to have converted from Judaism. Joseph ha-Kohen was highly regarded as a historian and physician. One of his chief concerns was also the release of the many Jewish captives taken by the vessels of the Italian republics and by the Corsairs; as in 1532, when Andrea Doria captured many Jews on taking Coron, Patras, and Zante; in 1535, when the emperor Charles V took Tunis; in 1542, when the galleys of Cegala Visconti had imprisoned a number of Jews.

Historical works
In Hebrew literature Joseph ha-Kohen achieved prominence by two historical works. His major work, Dibre ha-Yamim le-Malke Zarfat we-'Otoman (Chronicles of the Kings of France and Turkey), is in the nature of a history of the world, in the form of annals, in which he represents the sequence of events as a conflict between Asia and Europe, between Islam and Christianity, the protagonist for Islam being the mighty Turkish empire, and for Christianity, France. With these two great groups he connects European history, beginning with the downfall of the Roman empire. In this he also includes narratives of persecutions of Jews during the first and second crusades, copied from eye-witness reports available to him in manuscript. The work was printed in 1554 at Venice but later put on index (Amnon Raz-Krakotzkin). It was reprinted in Amsterdam in 1733. Parts were translated into German and French; the entire work was issued in English, but badly translated, by Bialloblotzky. He continued, however, the work on it, as is evident from autographs preserved in British Library.

He undoubtedly tried to be a careful historian. He gathered his facts from all possible sources, made notes, kept registers, and conducted a wide correspondence. He added continually to the first redaction of his works, carefully dating each one. Of his second chronicle Emeq ha-Bakha (The Vale of Tears) he thus made at least four updated editions. Yet his style is monotonous, although he tries to write in a biblical style. Having lived in Italy from his childhood and become acquainted with persons prominent politically, he is a valuable source for the history of his time; concerning many events, he had examined witnesses. He also mentions a number of important facts ignored by other historians. He is less accurate in the treatment of ancient history, for which he often was obliged to consult untrustworthy sources.

This is the first known work by a Jewish writer describing the history of non-Jews.

The Jewish Annals
His  second chronicle is an extract from his world chronicle of items concerning persecutions of the Jews. To this he added material from Samuel Usque's Consolaçam as Tribulaçoens de Ysrael (1557), the chronicle of Abraham ibn Daud  as well as other material that had reached him, calling it Emeq ha-Bakha (The Vale of Tears). Its set purpose in the introduction to the book was to serve as reading on the fast of 9 Av. There he dwells upon the sorrows and sufferings the Jews endured in various countries in the course of centuries. The book, which is a martyrology from beginning to end, closes with the 24th of Tammuz, 5335 AM (1575 CE). The tenor of the book makes it an out-spoken representative of "the lachrymose conception of Jewish history" (Salo Baron).

Joseph ha-Kohen finished the first version of this work in 1558, at Voltaggio. Another version was finished in 1563, a third version ca 1565, and the fourth and final version in 1575. It circulated in Italy in manuscript and was edited for the first time by Samuel David Luzzatto and published in 1852 by Max Letteris. In 1858 M. Wiener published a German translation. A modern text-critical edition, edited by Karin Almbladh, appeared in 1981.

Joseph ha-Kohen wrote also a Hebrew version, with the title Meqitz Nirdamim, of Meïr Alguadez's Spanish medical work giving prescriptions for the healing of various diseases; to these prescriptions he added some of his own.

Other works
Less known is his work upon the New World. In his world-chronicle there is a reference to Columbus (whom, however, he confounds with Amerigo Vespucci); the work is very meager in its information. After writing it he became acquainted with Francisco López de Gómara's Historia General de las Indias and Joan Boemus's Omnium Gentium Mores Leges et Ritus. From these, in 1557, he compiled his Matztib Gebulot 'Ammim (Who Setteth the Boundaries of Nations), a history of the conquest of Mexico, to which he added a full account of the discoveries of Columbus. This work was published in 2002 by Moshe Lazar.

A small work of a different kind was his Peles ha-Shemot, written in 1561, containing an alphabetical list of Hebrew nouns, with scripture illustrations of their occurrence given for the purpose of fixing their gender — a matter in which (as he says) "many writers in Hebrew erred." He also compiled, in 1567, a book of polite formulas to be used in addressing letters, and a large number of verses, which are found, written in his own hand, at the end of his works. A large number of letters, evidently meant to serve as models, are found in the MSS. Rabbinowicz, No. 129 (now in Budapest and edited by Abraham David in 1985). Two-thirds of these are by Joseph ha-Kohen; they give a good insight into his private life.

Notes

Bibliography
 Karin Almbladh (ed.) Sefer Emeq ha-Bakha : The vale of tears : with the chronicle of the anonymous Corrector /Joseph ha-Kohen ; introd., critical ed., comments by Karin Almbladh, Uppsala 1981 
 Robert Bonfil, "Chi era Ludovico Carretto, apostata?" in: Guido Nathan Zazzu (Ed.), E andammo dove il vento ci spinse. La cacciata degli ebrei dalla Spagna. (Genova: Marietti, 1992), 51-58
 Robert Bonfil (ed.), Josef ha-Cohen, Sefer Emeq Ha-Bakha (The Vale of Tears), Magnes, Jerusalem 2020 (in Hebrew).
 Abraham David (ed.). The letters of Joseph ha-Kohen : the author of Emeq ha-bakha. Jerusalem 1985.
 Martin Jacobs, Islamische Geschichte in jüdischen Chroniken : hebräische Historiographie des 16. und 17. Jahrhunderts Tübingen 2004 
 Martin Jacobs, "Joseph ha-Kohen, Paolo Giovio, and Sixteenth-Century Historiography", in Cultural Intermediaries: Jewish Intellectuals in Early-Modern Italy, ed. David B. Ruderman, Giuseppe Veltri (Philadelphia: University of Pennsylvania Press, 2004), 67-85.
 Martin Jacobs, "Sephardic Migration and Cultural Transfer: The Ottoman and Spanish Expansion through a Cinquecento Jewish Lens," Journal of Early Modern History 21, no. 6 (2017): 516-542. 
 Mosheh Lazar (ed.), Sefer ha-Indiʾah ha-ḥadashah ; Ṿe-Sefer Fernando Ḳorṭeś, 1553 Lancaster, Calif 2002 
 Ana María Riaño López El manuscrito de Ha-Kohén. Granada, 2002. 
 Pilar Leon Tello (trans.) ʻEmeq ha-bakha de Yosef ha-Kohen : estudio preliminar, trad. y notas par Pilar Leon Tello Madrid 1964
Max Letteris, introduction to the Hebrew edition of Emeq Habachah
Wiener, introduction to the German edition of the same work
Heinrich Grätz, Geschichte der Juden 3d ed., ix. 324 et seq., especially "Isidore Loeb, Josef Haccohev et les Chroniqueurs Juifs", in Revue des Etudes Juives xvi. 28 et seq. (also published separately)
Isidore Loeb, "Josef Haccohev et les Chroniqueurs Juifs", in Revue des Etudes Juives xvi. 28 et seq. (also published separately).
 Amnon Raz-Krakotzkin, The censor, the editor, and the text : the Catholic Church and the shaping of the Jewish canon in the sixteenth century. University of Pennsylvania Press, 2007 , 
See also Richard Gottheil, "Columbus in Jewish Literature", in Publications of the American Jewish Historical Society ii. 129 et seq.

External links
 Mindel, Nissan, Gallery of Our Great.
 Raphael, David, Expulsion 1492 Chronicles.

1496 births
1570s deaths
Jewish historians
Kohanim writers of Rabbinic literature
Physicians from Avignon
Italian Sephardi Jews
16th-century French historians
16th-century Italian physicians
16th-century Jewish physicians
16th-century Italian writers
16th-century male writers
16th-century Italian Jews